Haraldseth is a Norwegian surname. Notable people with the surname include:

Fredrik Haraldseth (born 1992), Norwegian cyclo-cross cyclist
Leif Haraldseth (1929–2019), Norwegian trade unionist and politician

Norwegian-language surnames